A feeder road may refer to:

 Frontage road, a road which runs parallel with high-speed roads, allowing easier access to local amenities
 Spur (road), a short road which provides specific access to one place, such as a sports venue or major business hub
 A secondary road which "feeds" traffic to main highways and freeways
 A common Texas term, not used in many other areas.